The Mexican football league system is organized by the Mexican Football Federation, except for the Liga MX  and the Ascenso MX that are organized independently; The tournaments consist of five levels, male and female professional levels. In addition to having the Copa MX which is also organized independently to the Femexfut.

Men
Liga MX, known as the Primera División (First Division) before the 2012–13 season, is the highest level of Mexican football and consists of 18 clubs. Each calendar year is split into two short tournaments, the Apertura (Opening) and the Clausura (Closing). In each short tournament, a club plays the other 17 clubs once. The home team switches, depending on the current short tournament.

A new champion is crowned for each short tournament through a playoff system consisting of 12 teams. The top four teams earned a first-round bye, qualifying directly to the liguilla, while the next 8 teams qualify to the qualifying round, known as repechaje that determines the next 4 liguilla spots. The clubs are re-seeded each round so that the highest seeded team remaining always plays the lowest seed remaining. In the repechaje, the 5th-placed team host the 12th, the sixth-ranked side host the 11th, and so on. If the two clubs are tied after 90 minutes, it proceeds directly to a penalty shoot-out. Starting in the quarterfinal round, the clubs (4 directly qualified teams and 4 qualifying round winners) play in a two-legged tie, with the higher-seed hosting the second leg. The team with the higher aggregate score advances to the next round. In the quarterfinals and semifinals, if the two clubs are tied on aggregate and away goals after both legs, the higher seed advances automatically. In the final, if both teams are tied after both legs, 30 minutes of extra time are played. If the clubs are still tied after that, the champion is determined by a penalty shoot-out.

One club is relegated to Liga de Expansión MX (and its predecessor, the Ascenso MX) each year (two short tournaments). To determine the club to be relegated, the ratio of points-to-games is kept for each team. The club that has the worst points-to-games ratio over the previous three years (six short tournaments) is relegated to Liga de Expansión MX.

It is organized by the Mexican Football Federation and consists of four levels.

Liga MX (18 clubs)
Liga de Expansión MX (18 clubs)
Liga Premier de México (44 clubs) (4 groups)
Liga TDP, (225 clubs) (18 groups)

As of 2021, promotion and relegation is suspended for at least five to six years since 2020 due to the shutdown of the Ascenso MX's which was caused by the COVID-19 pandemic and financial woes.

{| clase="wikitable" style="text-align: center;"
|-south
!colspan="1" width="4%"  | Level
!colspan="1" width="96%" | League(s)/Division(s)
|-
|colspan="1" width="4%"  | 1
|colspan="1" width="96%" | Liga MX 18 clubs
|- style="background:#c8c8c8"
| style="width:4%;"| 
| colspan="1" style="width:96%;"| ↓↑ 1 club
|-
|colspan="1" width="4%"  | 2
|colspan="1" width="96%" | Liga de Expansión MX 18 clubs
|- style="background:#c8c8c8"
| style="width:4%;"|
| colspan="1" style="width:96%;"| ↓↑ 1 club
|-
|colspan="1" width="4%"  | 3
|colspan="1" width="96%" | Liga Premier 44 clubs (in four groups)
|- style="background:#c8c8c8"
| style="width:4%;"|
| colspan="1" style="width:96%;"| ↓↑ 4 clubs
|-
|colspan="1" width="4%"  | 4
|colspan="1" width="96%" | Liga TDP 225 clubs (in eighteen groups)
|-
|}

International Competitions
The champions and runners-up of the Apertura and Clausura tournaments earn a spot in the CONCACAF Champions League. Between 2005 and 2008, 2 Mexican teams were invited to participate in the Copa Sudamericana.

Beginning in Apertura 2014 (2015 edition), two Mexican clubs that qualify to the Copa Libertadores are the best eligible teams in Apertura tournament not participating in the CONCACAF Champions League and one Mexican club that qualifies to the Copa Libertadores''' are the champions of Supercopa MX.

Women 

Established in 2007, the women's league consists of two levels – the top division Super Liga and the lower division Liga Premier.  As of Apertura 2012, there were 19 clubs participating in the Super Liga and 11 clubs in Premier. In September 2017 the Liga MX Femenil started. It's an under-23 league for Mexican nationals. It's unconnected to the SuperLiga. There also is a Liga Mayor Femenil, which established in 2012 is also unconnected to those two others.

See also 
 Football in Mexico

References

External links 
Official website of Liga MX and Ascenso MX
Official website of Segunda División de México
Official website of Tercera División de México
Official website of Liga Mexicana de Fútbol Femenil
Mexico women football news

 
Football league systems in North America